Strike the Blood is an anime series adapted from the light novel series of the same title written by Gakuto Mikumo with illustrations by Manyako. Produced by Silver Link and Connect, the series is directed by Hideyo Yamamoto with scripts by Hiroyuki Yoshino and character design by Keiichi Sano. The series aired from October 4, 2013 to March 28, 2014 on AT-X. Crunchyroll (with distribution by Discotek Media) released the anime series in a combined Blu-ray/DVD format on November 8, 2016.

On March 15, 2015, publisher Dengeki Bunko announced that a two-part OVA based on an original story by creator Gakuto Mikumo would be released by year's end. On August 14, 2015, further details were announced for Strike the Blood: Valkyria's Kingdom which would be released on DVD/BRD on November 25 and December 23 of that year.

A second 4 volume, 8 episode OVA series based on the 9th light novel, co-produced by Silver Link and Connect and with returning director Hideyo Yamamoto, was released between November 21, 2016 and May 24, 2017.

A third 10 episode OVA series, produced by Connect and with returning director Hideyo Yamamoto, debuted on December 19, 2018, and concluded on September 29, 2019.

Another OVA titled Strike the Blood: Kieta Seisō-hen was released on January 29, 2020. A fourth OVA series, projected at 12 episodes, debuted on April 8, 2020, and concluded on June 30, 2021. The staff from the third OVA series returned to reprise their roles.

After the conclusion of Strike the Blood IV, a fifth and final OVA series titled Strike the Blood Final was released from March 30 to July 29, 2022.

Series overview

Episode list

Strike the Blood (2013–14)

Strike the Blood II (2016–17)

Strike the Blood III (2018–19)

Strike the Blood IV (2020–21)

Strike the Blood Final (2022)

References

Strike the Blood